The 1979–80 Divizia C was the 24th season of Liga III, the third tier of the Romanian football league system.

Team changes

To Divizia C
Relegated from Divizia B
 Relon Ceahlăul Piatra Neamț
 Drobeta Turnu-Severin
 Mureșul Deva
 Oltul Sfântu Gheorghe
 Electroputere Craiova
 CIL Sighetu Marmației
 Victoria Tecuci
 Șantierul Naval Oltenița
 Victoria Călan
 Constructorul Iași
 Chimia Brazi
 CFR Timișoara

Promoted from County Championship
 Celuloza Piatra Neamț
 Textila Buhuși
 ASA Iași
 FNC Săhăteni
 Șantierul Naval Brăila
 Rapid Fetești
 Progresul Isaccea
 Viitorul Chirnogi
 Danubiana București
 Electrodul Slatina
 Petrolul Târgoviște
 Dunărea Calafat
 Unirea Drobeta-Turnu Severin
 CPL Caransebeș
 Explorări Deva
 Victoria Elcond Zalău
 Alumina Oradea
 Metalul Carei
 Simared Baia Mare
 CPL Sebeș
 Vitrometan Mediaș
 Faianța Sighișoara
 Mureșul Toplița
 Carpați Covasna

From Divizia C
Promoted to Divizia B
 CS Botoșani
 Energia Gheorghiu-Dej
 Unirea Focșani
 Cimentul Medgidia
 Mecanică Fină București
 Flacăra-Automecanica Moreni
 Pandurii Târgu Jiu
 Unirea Alba Iulia
 Strungul Arad
 Someșul Satu Mare
 Carpați Mârșa
 Viitorul Gheorgheni

Relegated to County Championship
 Tepro Iași
 Unirea Săveni
 Aripile Bacău
 Oituz Târgu Ocna
 Petrolistul Boldești
 Metalosport Galați
 Tractorul Viziru
 Arrubium Măcin
 Automecanica București
 Victoria Lehliu
 Chimia Găești
 Cetatea Turnu Măgurele
 Forestierul Băbeni
 Constructorul Târgu Jiu
 ICRAL Timișoara
 Metalul Hunedoara
 Minerul Bihor
 Tehnofrig Cluj-Napoca
 Rapid Jibou
 Viitorul Șimleu Silvaniei
 Inter Sibiu
 Textila Cisnădie
 Avântul Măneciu
 IRA Câmpina

Renamed teams 
Electrodul Slatina was renamed as IPC Slatina.

Avântul Urziceni was renamed as Ferom Urziceni.

Azotul Slobozia was renamed as Amonil Slobozia.

Unirea Tricolor Brăila was renamed as Chimia Brăila.

Celuloza Călărași was renamed as Dunărea Călărași.

Unirea Drăgășani was renamed as Viitorul Drăgășani.

Minerul Rovinari was renamed as Metalul Rovinari.

Gloria Drobeta-Turnu Severin was moved from Drobeta-Turnu Severin to Strehaia and was renamed as Gloria Strehaia.

Mureșul Deva was renamed as Minerul Deva.

Alumina Oradea was renamed as Unirea Oradea.

CFR Constructorul Arad was renamed as CFR Arad.

Construcții Montaj Cluj-Napoca was renamed as Construcții Electrometal Cluj-Napoca.

Izvorul Târgu Secuiesc was renamed as Metalul Târgu Secuiesc.

Other changes 
Relonul Săvinești took the place of Bradul Roznov.

Automecanica București spared from relegation due to the withdrawal of Unirea Tricolor București

League tables

Seria I

Seria II

Seria III

Seria IV

Seria V

Seria VI

Seria VII

Seria VIII

Seria IX

Seria X

Seria XI

Seria XII

See also 
 1979–80 Divizia A
 1979–80 Divizia B
 1979–80 County Championship

References 

Liga III seasons
3
Romania